Great Northern Way–Emily Carr is a planned underground station for the Millennium Line of Metro Vancouver's SkyTrain rapid transit system. It will be located at the intersection of Great Northern Way and Thornton Street adjacent to the Emily Carr University of Art and Design in the Strathcona neighbourhood of Vancouver, British Columbia, Canada. Originally scheduled to open in 2025, the station's projected opening was pushed back to early 2026 in November 2022.

During planning, the station was known simply as Great Northern Way. On September 17, 2020, the station was renamed to include reference to Emily Carr University.

Station information

Structure and design

Similar to Olympic Village station, Great Northern Way–Emily Carr will be built in the staging pit used for the two tunnel boring machines.

References

External links

Millennium Line stations
Railway stations scheduled to open in 2026
Buildings and structures in Vancouver
Proposed railway stations in Canada